The Dream Makers (simplified Chinese: 志在四方) is a Singaporean television drama series. The story revolves around the lives of employees in a TV station, giving viewers a peek into what is behind the scenes in the entertainment world. It is told in two parts, the first being the mid-yeor anniversary drama celebrating 50 years of television, and the second coinciding MediaCorp's big move from Caldecott Hill to Mediapolis@one-north.

A total of 62 episodes have aired as of 18 January 2016 on Channel 8.

Series overview

Episodes

The Dream Makers (2013)

The Dream Makers II (2015)

References

Lists of Singaporean television series episodes
Mediacorp